A valvula is a small valve or fold.

Valvula may refer to:
 Valvula tricuspidalis, the tricuspid valve of the heart
 Valvula sinus coronarii, the valve of coronary sinus
 Valvula venae cavae inferioris, the valve of the inferior vena cava